Prasophyllum praecox, commonly known as the early leek orchid, is a species of orchid endemic to South Australia. It has a single tubular leaf and up to ten green to greenish brown and white flowers and is found in the southern parts of the Yorke Peninsula in South Australia.

Description
As with others in the genus, the flowers are inverted so that the labellum is above the column rather than below it. The upturned part has wavy edges and there is a broad egg-shaped, yellowish green callus with a dark green centre, in the middle of the labellum. Flowering occurs from late July to September.

Taxonomy and naming
Prasophyllum praecox was first formally described in 2006 by David Jones from a specimen collected near Brentwood and the description was published in Australian Orchid Research. The specific epithet (praecox) is a Latin word meaning "precocious", referring to the early flowering of this orchid.

Distribution and habitat
The early leek orchid usually grows in low heath and occurs in the southern parts of the Yorke Peninsula.

References

External links 
 

praecox
Flora of South Australia
Plants described in 2006
Endemic orchids of Australia